Exeter Book Riddle 26 (according to the numbering of the Anglo-Saxon Poetic Records) is one of the Old English riddles found in the later tenth-century Exeter Book.

The riddle is almost unanimously solved as 'gospel book'.

Text and translation 

As edited by Krapp and Dobbie, and translated by Megan Cavell, the riddle reads:

Editions, translations, and recordings

Editions

 Krapp, George Philip and Elliott Van Kirk Dobbie (eds), The Exeter Book, The Anglo-Saxon Poetic Records, 3 (New York: Columbia University Press, 1936), pp. 193-94.
 Williamson, Craig (ed.), The Old English Riddles of the Exeter Book (Chapel Hill: University of North Carolina Press, 1977).
 Muir, Bernard J. (ed.), The Exeter Anthology of Old English Poetry: An Edition of Exeter Dean and Chapter MS 3501, 2nd edn, 2 vols (Exeter: Exeter University Press, 2000).
 Foys, Martin et al. (eds.) Old English Poetry in Facsimile Project (Madison, WI: Center for the History of Print and Digital Culture, 2019-). Online edition annotated and linked to digital facsimile, with a modern translation.

Translations

 Jane Hirschfield, 'Some enemy took my life', in The Word Exchange: Anglo-Saxon Poems in Translation, ed. by Greg Delanty and Michael Matto (New York and London: Norton, 2011), pp. 164-67

Recordings 

 Michael D. C. Drout, 'Riddle 26', Anglo-Saxon Aloud (24 October 2007) (performed from the Anglo-Saxon Poetic Records edition).

References 

Riddles
Old English literature
Old English poetry